Unexpect (often stylized as uneXpect, or unexpecT, and UnexpecT) was a Canadian avant-garde extreme metal band from Montréal, featuring a unique amalgamation of different metal subgenres like progressive metal, death metal, black metal and melodic heavy metal, and of other styles of music including European classical, medieval, opera, gypsy jazz, electro, ambient, noise, and circus music.

The band's debut album, Utopia, was independently released. The band only had word of mouth and the Internet to market the work. With unorthodox distribution and online support, the album sold successfully. They released their two following albums via The End Records, before returning to independent releases.

History
Two of the founding members had a long tenure with the band: Artagoth and SyriaK. Unexpect recorded their first album, Utopia, in 1998, and released it in 1999 independently. The 2003 EP _We, Invaders was released in November 2003 on the Canadian label Galy Records. They then signed with New York-based The End Records and the band's second album In a Flesh Aquarium was released on August 22, 2006, in North America. Unexpect released their third album, Fables of the Sleepless Empire, on May 31, 2011. The band won the 7th annual Independent Music Awards Vox Pop vote for best Hard Rock/Metal Album with In a Flesh Aquarium.

On August 22, 2015, after the band had been inactive for almost three years, and with few updates, an announcement was made on their official Facebook page stating the members had decided to disband for good and pursue their own personal musical endeavours.

Members

Last line-up
 Eryk "Syriak" Chapados – lead vocals, guitar (1996–2015) (ex-Ekinox, ex-Magister Dixit)
 Stéphane "Artagoth" English – lead vocals, guitar (1996–2015)
 Roxanne "Leïlindel" Hegyesy – lead vocals (2001–2015)
 Frédérick "ChaotH" Filiatrault – bass (2001–2015) (Humanoid)
 Landryx – drums (2004–2015) (ex-Decadawn, ex-Eclipse Prophecy)
 Blaise Borboën-Léonard – violin (2007–2015)

Session members
 Nathalie Duchesne - additional violin, cello (2003–2015)
 Stéphanie Colerette - additional violin, cello (2003–2015)
 Amélie Blanchette - clarinet (2006–2015)

Former members
 Véronique "Elda" Michaud – lead vocals (1996–2001)
 Mathieu "Zircon" Phaneuf – bass (1996–2001)
 Olivier "Merzenya" Genest – keyboards (1996–2001)
 Anthony Trujillo – drums (2002)
 Dasnos – drums (2003)
 Charles "Le Bateleur" Crépeau – violin (1996–2006)
 Stéphane "ExoD" Primeau – drums (1996-2002), keyboards, piano, sampling (2002-2010)

Timeline

Discography
 Utopia  (1999, self-released)
 _wE, Invaders EP (2003, Galy Records; distributed by The End Records)
 In a Flesh Aquarium (2006, The End Records)
 Fables of the Sleepless Empire (2011, self-released)

References

External links
 , archived on July 28, 2015
 UneXpect at The End Records

Canadian progressive metal musical groups
Avant-garde metal musical groups
Musical groups from Montreal
Musical groups established in 1996
Musical groups disestablished in 2015
1996 establishments in Quebec
2015 disestablishments in Quebec